Daaden is a municipality in the district of Altenkirchen, in Rhineland-Palatinate, Germany. It is situated in the Westerwald, approx. 15 km south-west of Siegen.

Daaden is the seat of the Verbandsgemeinde ("collective municipality") Daaden-Herdorf.

References

External links 
  (German)

Altenkirchen (district)